This is a list of railway stations in Kent, a county in the South East of England. It includes all railway stations that are part of the National Rail network, and which are currently open and have timetabled train services. Southeastern provides most of these services, with Southern and Thameslink providing the remainder.

The majority of services run into one of the London terminals of Blackfriars, Cannon Street, Charing Cross, London Bridge and Victoria.

Stations

See also
 List of railway stations in Dover
 List of railway stations in Essex

References

Kent
 
Railway stations